Fifth Angel is the first studio album by the American heavy metal band Fifth Angel. It was originally released in 1986. Musically, it shows much more resemblance to modern power metal than their other albums. After recording a four song demo in late 1983 and early 1984, which they sent to over 100 record labels, Mike Varney of Shrapnel Records signed the band and financed the recording of five additional songs and released the album in 1986. Epic Records re-released it in 1988 with new artwork.

The record was produced by Fifth Angel and Terry Date.

Track listing
All songs written by Pilot, Archer and Byrd except "Only the Strong Survive" by Pilot, Archer, Byrd, Mary

Personnel
Band Members
 Ted Pilot – lead vocals
 James Byrd – lead guitar, vocals
 Ed Archer – rhythm guitar, bass (uncredited) and vocals
 Ken Mary – drums, vocals
 Randy Hansen – bass (uncredited)
 Kenny Kay – bass (credited on original release, but does not play on the record)

Production
 Produced by Terry Date & Fifth Angel
 Recorded and mixed at Steve Lawson Productions
 Terry Date – engineer, mixing
 Mastered at Fantasy Studios 
 George Horn – mastering
 Maarten De Boer – mastering
 Guy Aitchison – cover art
 Ed Archer – cover concept

Charts

References

1986 debut albums
Shrapnel Records albums
Fifth Angel albums